Hayes is an unincorporated community in Douglas County, Illinois, United States.

History
Hayes was founded in 1877. The community was named for Samuel Jarvis Hayes, a railroad official.

References

Unincorporated communities in Douglas County, Illinois
Unincorporated communities in Illinois